Anand Vihar is an interchange metro station located on the Blue Line and the Pink Line of Delhi Metro. The station is located in the Anand Vihar locality near the interstate border between Delhi and Uttar Pradesh and is a major connectivity hub of East Delhi. It is connected to the Anand Vihar ISBT and Anand Vihar Railway Terminal.

Phase III construction
Under Phase III, Anand Vihar was become an interchange station with the Inner Ring Road line. From here, passengers can find easier connection to other lines as well as places such as Yamuna Vihar and Mukundpur which currently do not have metro access.

Station

Station layout

Facilities
The station has the following facilities:

Token Vending Machine: Two token vending machines- one on the railway side near token counter and other on the ISBT side near TOM
Automatic Vending Machine: Two automatic vending machines- one on the railway side near token counter and other on the ISBT side near TOM  
ATM: YES bank ATM and two PNB ATMs on the unpaid concourse
Toilet: 3 Sulabh Toilets- On the corridor approaching the Railway station, near the exit AFC gate and ear Kaushambi foot over bridge
Shop/Office: WH Smith- On the paid concourse near SCR

Exits

Connections

Bus

DTC buses:
The station is located close to Anand Vihar ISBT, which provides convenient transit to different regions. DTC and cluster buses of Delhi along with buses to Uttar Pradesh and Uttarakhand are available from here.
DTC bus routes number 0GL-23, 0OMS(+), 33, 33A, 33EXT, 33C, 33LINKSTL, 33LNKSTL, 33LSTL, 39A, 73, 73LNKSTL, 85, 85AEXT, 85EXT, 88A, 143, 165, 165A, 202, 212, 221, 0236, 236, 236EXT, 243A, 243B, 311A, 333, 341, 357A, 396, 469, 534, 534A, 534C, 542, 543A, 0534A, 543, 543STL, 623A, 623ACL, 624A, 624ACL, 624BLNKSTL, 723, 740, 740A, 740B, 740EXT, 857, 939, 943, 971, 971A, AC-534, AC-971A, AC-Anand Vihar ISBT Terminal - Gurugram Bus Stand, AC-GL-23, Anand Vihar ISBT Terminal - Gurugram Bus Stand, GL-22, GL-23, GL23, OMS(+), OMS(-), OMS(+) AC, YMS(-) and YMS(+) serve the station from nearby Maharajpur Check Post bus stop.

Delhi Metro feeder buses:
Electric AC Feeder bus service MC-719 starts from Anand Vihar metro station and passes through the following bus stops: Yojana Vihar, Yamuna Krida Sthan, Ram Vihar, Anand Vihar, Delhi Heart Hospital, Jagriti Enclave, Saini Enclave, Karkardooma Metro station, Arya Nagar, Village Dayanand Vihar, DSSSB, Hargobind Enclave, Hasanpur Depot, Hasanpur Village and Gazipur, before coming back to the station. It runs in a loop. 
Feeder bus service ML-53 starts from Dilshad Garden metro station and ends at Mayur Vihar Ph-III. It passes through the following bus stops: Surya Nagar (Indian Oil Petrol Pump), Ram Prastha Xing, Anand Vihar ISBT, Gazi Pur Depot, Gazi Pur Village, Trilok Puri Mod, Dallu Pura Mod, Mayur Vihar Phase-III Xing, Bharti Public School and CRPF camp.
Feeder bus service ML-53A starts from Seemapuri and ends at Mayur Vihar Ph-III. It passes through the following bus stops: Seemapuri Terminal, Dilshad Garden MS, Surya Nagar(Indian Oil Petrol Pump), Ram Prastha Xing, Anand Vihar ISBT, Gazi Pur Depot, Gazi Pur Village, Trilok Puri Mod, Dallu Pura Mod, Mayur Vihar Phase-III Xing, Bharti Public School and CRPF camp.
Feeder bus service MC-341 starts from Mayur Vihar Ph-III and ends at Harsh Vihar. It passes through the following bus stops: CRPF Camp, Mayur Vihar III A-1, Bharti Public School, New Kondli A-1, Mayur Vihar Phase-3 Mor, Mayur Vihar Phase-3  X-ing, Ganpati Mandir, Fire Station Dallupura, Dallupura, Kondli, Kalyanpuri Mor, Gazipur Dairy, Gazipur X-ing NH-24, Gazipur Village, Tata Telco, Gazipur Depot, Anand Vihar Metro Station , Anand Vihar ISBT, Ram Prastha X-ing, Ram Prastha Mandir, Surya Nagar, Dilshad Garden Metro Station, Shahdra Border, Shahdra Border, Dilshad Garden J&K Block, Old Seemapuri, Seemapuri Depot, Dlf X-ing, Radha Krishna Mandir, Anand Gram, Tahirpur, Mata Mandir and Sunder Nagri/ Gagan Cinema.

Rail
Anand Vihar Terminal railway station of Indian Railways is situated nearby.

RRTS
In future, the station will connect to Delhi-Meerut RRTS's Anand Vihar station, which will be one of four underground stations of the RRTS.

Gallery

See also

Delhi
List of Delhi Metro stations
Transport in Delhi
Delhi Metro Rail Corporation
Delhi Suburban Railway
Delhi Monorail
Anand Vihar Terminal railway station
Delhi Transport Corporation
East Delhi
New Delhi
National Capital Region (India)
List of rapid transit systems
List of metro systems

References

External links

 Delhi Metro Rail Corporation Ltd. (Official site)
 Delhi Metro Annual Reports
 
 UrbanRail.Net – descriptions of all metro systems in the world, each with a schematic map showing all stations.

Delhi Metro stations
Railway stations opened in 2010
Railway stations in East Delhi district